The 2003–04 St. John's Red Storm men's basketball team represented St. John's University during the 2003–04 NCAA Division I men's basketball season. The team was coached by Mike Jarvis in his sixth year at the school until he was replaced by interim coach Kevin Clark. St. John's home games are played at Carnesecca Arena, then called Alumni Hall, and Madison Square Garden and the team is a member of the Big East Conference.

Off season

Departures

Class of 2003 signees

Roster

Schedule and results

|-
!colspan=9 style="background:#FF0000; color:#FFFFFF;"| Exhibition

|-
!colspan=9 style="background:#FF0000; color:#FFFFFF;"| Non-Conference Regular Season

|-
!colspan=9 style="background:#FF0000; color:#FFFFFF;"| Big East Conference Regular Season

References

St. John's Red Storm men's basketball seasons
St. John's
St John
St John